The uterosacral ligaments (or rectouterine ligaments) are major ligaments of uterus that extend posterior-ward from the cervix to attach onto the (anterior aspect of the) sacrum.

Anatomy

Microanatomy/histology 
The uterosacral ligaments consist of fibrous connective tissue, and smooth muscle tissue.

Relations 
The uterosacral ligaments pass inferior to the peritoneum. They embrace the rectouterine pouch, and rectum. The pelvic splanchnic nerves run on top of the ligament.

Function 
The uterosacral ligaments pull the cervix posterior-ward, counteracting the anterior-ward pull exerted by the round ligament of uterus upon the fundus of the uterus, thus maintaining anteversion of the body of the uterus.

Clinical significance 
The uterosacral ligaments may be palpated during a rectal examination, but not during pelvic examination.

References

Ligaments
Pelvis
Uterus